Steven M. Martin (born October 24, 1954)  is an American actor and filmmaker, who wrote and directed Theremin: An Electronic Odyssey, which earned him a Filmmakers Trophy at the 1994 Sundance Film Festival.

Career
Martin has worked as an actor with his identical twin brother Douglas Brian Martin. They played the silent twin bodyguards Igg and Ook in Hudson Hawk and as conjoined twin Addams family members Dexter and Donald in The Addams Family and Addams Family Values.  They also played as the "angry twins" in Fast Times At Ridgemont High.

In 1982, Martin (along with his twin brother) directed the music video for the song, "I Predict" by the rock/ new wave band, Sparks. They also played two brothers turned into human-like mutant creatures in the music video for the Devo song, "Through Being Cool" the previous year in 1981.

He made a documentary on Léon Theremin, the inventor of the theremin, one of the first electronic musical instruments, which was critically acclaimed.

References

External links

American music video directors
American film directors
Identical twins
1954 births
Living people
American twins